Healing the Wounds (HTW) is a British charity launched in December 2009 to help provide support and care for British servicemen and women suffering from posttraumatic stress disorder
It was founded by Kevin Richards, a former British Army combat medic, who recognised the lack of aftercare support and treatment for sufferers of PTSD in Wales.

History
Healing the Wounds was founded by Kevin Richards in 2009. Richards had previously served with the Royal Regiment of Wales as a combat medic and completed tours of duty in numerous countries including Northern Ireland and Operation Desert Storm. His involvement with the Royal Welsh Veterans Association and his own background in army medicine led him to recognise the lack of support for PTSD sufferers in Wales and made him determined to do something to help.

Campaigns

Golden Grove Mansion Appeal
Since Healing the Wounds' foundation, the charity campaigned to raise funds to purchase and maintain a convalescent home based at Golden Grove Mansion in Llandeilo, Carmarthenshire. However, by January 2011 the condition of Golden Grove had deteriorated to such an extent that it would not have been financially viable to renovate and maintain the mansion as a retreat for PTSD sufferers. Nevertheless, Healing the Wounds remains devoted to the development of a convalescent home within Wales and the £120,000 raised through the campaign shall be spent on treatment for those suffering from PTSD.

Fundraising activities

Nation Radio campaign
Between 14 November and 2 December 2011, Healing the Wounds was chosen as a nominated charity for a fundraising campaign by South Wales radio station, Nation Radio.

Criticism
A BBC investigation criticised Healing the Wounds' use of Neuro-linguistic programming and the inaccurate description of the experience of one of its counsellors.

Trustees
The trustees are:
 William John – Chairman of the Bridgend Branch of The Royal Welsh Association
 Arfon Williams – Former Combat Medic, Royal Regiment of Wales and current Vice Chairman of the British Legion, Ynysybwl Branch

Patrons
The patrons are:
 Brigadier Robert Aitken CBE
 Michael Sheen, actor
 Nigel Owens, rugby union referee

References

External links
 Official website

British veterans' organisations
Health charities in the United Kingdom
Organizations established in 2009
2009 establishments in the United Kingdom